Inside Out is the sixth studio album by MC Hammer (fifth excluding his independent debut). It was released via Giant Records and Reprise Records on September 12, 1995. After the decrease in popularity and sales of his previous album, The Funky Headhunter, Hammer returned to his previous pop rap image.

Inside Out featured emotionally-driven gospel dance tracks. The album spawned two singles: "Sultry Funk" and "Goin' Up Yonder". "Nothing But Love (A Song for Eazy)" was dedicated to Eazy-E, who had died in 1995. In contrast to his prior albums, the singles did not go as far as previous releases.

The album peaked at number 23 on the Billboard Top R&B/Hip-Hop Albums chart, but only reached number 119 on the Billboard 200, causing Giant Records to drop Hammer and his Oaktown Records subsidiary from the label.

Critical reception 

AllMusic's Stephen Thomas Erlewine felt that Hammer was "unsure of himself throughout the album, attempting to gain some street credibility and a mass audience simultaneously." He concluded that, "[T]he result is a record that has a few good isolated moments, but never delivers a knockout punch, let alone a memorable hook or groove." Tom Sinclair from Entertainment Weekly said that, "Even if nothing here touches "U Can't Touch This," the material is well crafted enough to convince you "Hammer Time" hasn't run out yet."

Track listing

Samples 
"Luv-N-Happiness"
"Devotion" (Live) by Earth, Wind & Fire
"Sultry Funk"
"Bop Gun (Endangered Species)" and "Give Up the Funk (Tear the Roof off the Sucker)" by Parliament
"How I Could Just Kill a Man" by Cypress Hill
"Anything Goes on the Dance Floor"
"Darkest Light" by Lafayette Afro Rock Band
"Keep On"
"Never Too Much" by Luther Vandross
"Bustin' Loose"
"Bustin' Loose" by Chuck Brown & the Soul Searchers
"A Brighter Day"
"If You Want Me to Stay" by Sly and the Family Stone

Personnel 
Adapted from the liner notes of Inside Out.

The High Street Bank Boys – background vocals (tracks 6, 8)
Todd Brown – background vocals (tracks 8, 9), mixing, vocal arrangements (track 9)
Ben Ross – background vocals, synthesizers, drum programming (track 9)
D-Style – guitar (track 9)
Ontario Hayes – piano (tracks 10, 11), additional organ (track 11)
Mike "Nite" Hersh – engineering (tracks 1, 2, 5-9)
Brian Mayfield – engineering (tracks 5, 6, 9), assistant engineering (tracks 1-4, 8, 12)
Dave Baker – engineering (tracks 10, 11)
John Rhone – engineering (tracks 10, 11)
Matt Campagna – assistant engineering (tracks 10, 11)
LindaEar Music (Fremont, CA) – clearance assistance
Victor Hall – art direction, logo design
Mel Peters – cover photography

References 

1995 albums
MC Hammer albums
Giant Records (Warner) albums